Manakkudaiyan is a village in the Sendurai taluk of Ariyalur district, Tamil Nadu, India.

Demographics 

 census, Manakkudaiyan had a total population of 3290 with 1614 males and 1676 females.

References 

Villages in Ariyalur district